Leutnant Hans Hoyer (20 September 1890 – 15 November 1917) was a German World War I soldier who was decorated as an artilleryman before turning to aviation. As a flyer, he became an ace credited with eight confirmed and three unconfirmed aerial victories before being killed in action while fighting.

Early life and service
Hans Hoyer was born in Rostock on 20 September 1890; however he was Saxon. He performed his required military service in 1911, joining the First Field Artillery Regiment of the German Army. He rejoined for World War I, this time in the Kingdom of Saxony's Twelfth Field Artillery Regiment.

World War I
Hoyer's valor while serving in field artillery won him the prestigious Knight's Cross of the Military Order of Saint Henry, awarded him on 30 November 1915.

He transferred to the Luftstreitkräfte in April 1916. By May 1916, he was operational with a two-seater unit, Flieger Abteilung 10, and stayed with them through their transition into Feldflieger Abteilung 270. In May 1917, he left the unit to attend Jastaschule. After being trained there as a fighter pilot, he joined Jasta 36 in late July under command of Walter von Bülow-Bothkamp. Hoyer would serve as acting Staffelführer from 4 August to 21 August 1917.

Flying against the Royal Flying Corps, Hoyer staked his first combat claim on 22 August 1917. By the time Bülow-Bothkamp took leave on 29 October, Hoyer's victory total stood at six confirmed and two unconfirmed. Bulow returned to command on 7 November, and Hoyer scored his eighth accredited victory the following day.

On 15 November 1917, Hoyer was on patrol flying an Albatros D.V. He was reported to have downed a Spad before being shot down and killed east of Zandvoorde, Belgium at 1215 hours. It is uncertain whether he fell to a Spad, or under the guns of Philip Fullard.

List of aerial victories
See also Aerial victory standards of World War I

Confirmed victories are numbered and listed chronologically. Unconfirmed victories are denoted by "u/c" and may or may not be listed by date.
{| class="wikitable" border="1" style="margin: 1em auto 1em auto"
|-
!No.
!Date/time
!Aircraft
!Foe
!Result
!Location
!Notes
|-
| align="center"| u/c
| align="center"| 22 August 1917
| Albatros D.III
| Sopwith
|
| Houthulst Forest, Belgium
|
|-
| align="center"| 1
| align="center"| 23 August 1917 @ 0835 hours
| Albatros D.III
| Bristol F.2 Fighter
| Destroyed
| Northeast of Zillebeke Lake, Belgium
| Victim was from No. 22 Squadron RFC
|-
| align="center"| 2
| align="center"| 3 September 1917 @ 1040 hours
| Albatros D.III
| Royal Aircraft Factory RE.8
| Destroyed
| West of Tenbrielen, Belgium
| Victim was from No. 4 Squadron RFC
|-
| align="center"| 3
| align="center"| 11 October 1917 @ 0830 hours
| Albatros D.III
| Royal Aircraft Factory SE.5a
| Destroyed
| Between Koelberg and Gheluvelt, Belgium
| Victim was from No. 56 Squadron RFC
|-
| align="center"| 4
| align="center"| 12 October 1917 @ 1215 hours
| Albatros D.III
| Sopwith Pup serial number B1830
| Destroyed
| Westrozebeke, Belgium
| Victim was from No. 66 Squadron RFC
|-
| align="center"| 5
| align="center"| 15 October 1917 @ 1510 hours
| Albatros D.III
| Bristol F.2b Fighter
| Destroyed
| Becelaere
| Victim was from No. 20 Squadron RFC
|-
| align="center"| u/c
| align="center"| 18 October 1917
| Albatros D.III
| Bristol F.2b Fighter
|
| Moorslede, Belgium
|
|-
| align="center"| 6
| align="center"| 24 October 1917 @ 1427 hours
| Albatros D.III
| Spad
| Destroyed
| South of Westroosebeke, Belgium
| Victim was from No. 23 Squadron RFC
|-
| align="center"| 7
| align="center"| 31 October 1917 @ 1610 hours
| Albatros D.III
| Royal Aircraft Factory SE.5a
| Destroyed
| Ketzelberg
| Victim was from No. 84 Squadron RFC
|-
| align="center"| 8
| align="center"| 8 November 1917 @ 1510 hours
| Albatros
| Royal Aircraft Factory SE.5a
| Destroyed
| Between Roeselare and Moorslede, Belgium
| Victim was from No. 84 Squadron RFC
|-
| align="center"| u/c
| align="center"| 15 November 1917
| Albatros
| Spad
|
| Zandvoorde, Belgium<ref>List collated from Franks, et al., pp. 43-44, 132, and The aerodrome website at http://www.theaerodrome.com/aces/germany/hoyer.php Retrieved 27 November 2011.</ref>
|
|-
|}

Awards and decorations
 Knight's Cross of Military Order of Saint Henry
 1914 Iron Cross, Second and First Class

Endnotes

References
 Franks, Norman, Frank W. Bailey, and Russell Guest (1993). Above the Lines: The Aces and Fighter Units of the German Air Service, Naval Air Service and Flanders Marine Corps, 1914-1918. Grub Street Publishing. , .
 Franks, Norman (2000). Albatros Aces of World War 1: Volume 32 of Aircraft of the Aces: Volume 32 of Osprey Aviation Series: Volume 32 of Osprey Aircraft of the Aces''. Osprey Publishing. , .

German World War I flying aces
1890 births
1917 deaths
Military personnel from Rostock
People from the Grand Duchy of Mecklenburg-Schwerin
Luftstreitkräfte personnel
German military personnel killed in World War I
Aviators killed by being shot down